Wizet is a video game development studio located in Seoul, South Korea. They reached commercial success with their hit game MapleStory and were absorbed into their publishing company, Nexon. Nexon developed a franchise system and expanded its services to Japan, China, Thailand, Malaysia, Singapore, Taiwan,  the United States, Europe, Brazil, and Vietnam. Eventually, Wizet reached the global world after having finished developing key features of MapleStory.

In Nexon Japan's 2011 financial deck, Wizet announced that Maplestory 2, a 3D sequel to Wizet's hit game, is in development.

History
Prior to joining Nexon America, Min Kim operated the successful launch of Maplestory as the Vice President of Global Business Development in Wizet Corporation. Min started his career in video games as a senior associate of business development at Nexon Corporation pursuing new business opportunities such as a social networking service, a board game business, and online game licensing, eventually becoming the Vice President, and later CEO, of the Nexon America branch.

MapleStory

The expansion of Wizet to the Global world of MapleStory began in January 2004. The open beta testing began in September 2004.

References

Companies based in Seoul
Video game companies established in 1999
MapleStory
Nexon
South Korean companies established in 1999
Video game companies of South Korea
Video game development companies

simple:Nexon